The 7.7 cm Feldkanone 96 neuer Art (7.7 cm FK 96 n.A.) was a field gun used by Germany in World War I.

Description
The gun combined the barrel of the earlier 7.7 cm FK 96 with a recoil system, a new breech and a new carriage. Existing FK 96s were upgraded over time. The FK 96 n.A. was shorter-ranged, but lighter than the French Canon de 75 modèle 1897 or the British Ordnance QF 18 pounder gun; the Germans placed a premium on mobility, which served them well during the early stages of World War I. However, once the front had become static, the greater rate of fire of the French gun and the heavier shells fired by the British gun put the Germans at a disadvantage. The Germans remedied this by developing the longer-ranged, but heavier 7.7 cm FK 16.

As with most guns of its era, the FK 96 n.A. had seats for two crewmen mounted on its splinter shield. Guns taken into service by Finland, Poland, Lithuania, Estonia and Latvia upon independence in 1919 served until replaced during the 1930s.

Variants 
 7.7 cm Kanone in Haubitzenlafette (KiH) -  or Cannon in Howitzer Carriage in English.  Mounted the barrel of the FK 96 n.A. on the carriage of the 10.5 cm Feldhaubitze 98/09 in an attempt to get more elevation and range.
 7.7 cm Nahkampfkanone - or Close Support Cannon in English.  Was a FK 96 n.A. with smaller diameter wheels, no bottom shield, and no footrests for the crew seats on the front of the shield.  It was an attempt to make a lighter and lower profile gun for close support.
 7.7 cm Infanteriegeschütze L/20 - or Infantry Gun L/20 in English.  Was a shortened FK 96 n.A. barrel mounted on a mountain gun carriage to create a light close support gun that could be disassembled for transport.
 7.7 cm Infanteriegeschütze L/27 - or Infantry Gun L/27 in English.  Was a FK 96 n.A. with smaller diameter wheels, and no crew seats.  It had a new shield that extended over the wheels of the carriage.  It was an attempt to make a lighter and lower profile gun for close support.
 QF 77 mm Mk I - was the British designation for a converted FK 96 n.A. barrel and recoil mechanism mounted on a HA/LA mount to arm merchant ships, Q ships, and small warships.

Ammunition
 Feldgranate 96: a 6.8 kilogram (15 lb) high-explosive shell filled with .19 kg (0.45 lbs) of TNT.
 FeldkanoneGeschoss 11: A 6.85 kilogram (15.1 lb) shell combining high explosive and shrapnel functions. It contained 294 10 gram lead bullets and .25 kilograms (0.55 lb) of TNT.
 A 6.8 kilogram (15 lb) pure shrapnel shell filled with 300 lead bullets.
 An anti-tank shell
 A smoke shell
 A star shell
 A gas shell
It mainly used the K.Z. 11 time fuse or the later L.K.Z. 16 contact fuse. Because they exploded without delay, shells with contact fuses were called "whizzbangs".

Users

Gallery

Surviving example 
A restored example of a FK 96 n.A. captured at the Battle of Hamel by Australian forces, has been restored and is on display at the Australian Armour & Artillery Museum.

See also
 7.7 cm FK 96 : predecessor forming basis of this weapon

Weapons of comparable role, performance and era
Ordnance BLC 15 pounder : British equivalent : similar upgrade of an older gun
3-inch M1902 field gun : US equivalent
10 cm M. 14 Feldhaubitze: Austrian equivalent

References 

 Hogg, Ian. Twentieth-Century Artillery. New York: Barnes & Noble Books, 2000 
 Jäger, Herbert. German Artillery of World War One. Ramsbury, Marlborough, Wiltshire: Crowood Press, 2001

External links

7.7 cm FK 96 n.A. on Landships
A gun of the Lovett Collection undergoing restoration
A 1917 model of the Lovett Collection undergoing restoration
List and pictures of WW1 surviving 7.7cm FK96 n.A. guns

World War I artillery of Germany
World War I guns
Artillery of the Ottoman Empire
77 mm artillery